Chiki Chiki is Anne Gadegaard's third studio album, containing 13 songs. It was as successful as her first album Arabiens Drøm. It was released in 2005 but not in the UK or the US. The first single from the album was the song "Chiki Chiki", a song with a catchy pop feel to it. Other songs to be released as singles from the album were "Dub I Dub" (song by the group Me & My), "Du Er Ikke Alene Mere", "Vamonos", "Syd For Gibraltar" and "Kan Du Mærke Beatet"a.

Track listing
(Titles is brackets are for rough translation purposes only)
 Chiki Chiki 
 Dub-I-Dub
 Giv En Chance Til (Give a second Chance)
 Du Er Ikke Alene Mere (You are Not Alone Anymore)
 MGP Sangen (MGP Song)
 Vamonos 
 Syd For Gibraltar (South of Gibraltar)
 Kan Du Mærke Beatet (Can You Feel The Beat)
 Kærester (Boyfriends)
 Kun En Drøm Herfra (Only a Dream From Here)
 Sommeren Er Her (Summer Is Here)
 Ønsketræet (Wish Tree)
 Historien Om Den Magiske Lampe (The Story of the Magic Lamp)

Chart performance

Weekly charts

Release history

References

Anne Gadegaard albums
2005 albums
Danish-language albums